Fuzhou East railway station (抚州东站) is a railway station located on the northern outskirts  of the county seat of Dongxiang County, in prefecture-level city of Fuzhou (not to be confused with larger Fuzhou, Fujian), in Jiangxi province, eastern China.

It serves the Hangzhou-Nanchang High-Speed Line, part of the Shanghai–Kunming high-speed railway.

Railway stations in Jiangxi
Fuzhou, Jiangxi